The São Francisco National Forest is a National forest in the state of Acre, Brazil.

Location

The São Francisco National Forest is in the municipality of Sena Madureira in the state of Acre.
It is in the Amazon biome.
It adjoins the Macauã National Forest, which lies to the north.
The Macauã River runs through the northern part of the forest.
The Chico Mendes Extractive Reserve is some distance to the south, on the opposite side of the Iaco River.

History

The São Francisco National Forest was created by federal decree on 7 August 2001.
It is administered by the Chico Mendes Institute for Biodiversity Conservation (ICMBio).
It is classed as IUCN protected area category VI (protected area with sustainable use of natural resources).
The objective is to support sustainable multiple use of forest resources and scientific research, with emphasis on methods for sustainable exploitation of native forests.

The consultative council of the Macauã and São Francisco national forests was created on 17 January 2002.
On 17 August 2008 the Instituto Nacional de Colonização e Reforma Agrária (National Institute for Colonization and Agrarian Reform, INCRA) recognised the forest as an agro-extractive project for 25 families.
On 1 December 2010 INCRA assigned the forest to ICMBio.
The management plan was approved on 25 May 2016.

Notes

Sources

2001 establishments in Brazil
National forests of Brazil
Protected areas of Acre (state)